Mikhail Yukhanovich Sado (Russian: Михаил Юханович Садо, Syriac: ܡܝܟ݂ܐܝܠ ܒܝܬ ܣܗܕܐ Mixael bit Sahda), (June 9, 1934 – August 30, 2010 ) was an Assyrian Russian linguist, scholar, Professor of Semitic languages, orientalist, politician, former paratrooper, and wrestling champion.

Mikhail Sado was born on June 9, 1934 in Leningrad. He was a linguist of Semitic languages and was fluent in many other Assyrian dialects. He taught Hebrew in Russian Orthodox seminaries. He obtained his doctorates in Oriental Studies at Leningrad University in 1951.

Sado was one of four principal leaders who established the Russian Social Christian Union for the Liberation of Peoples. He spent thirteen years (1967–1980) in prison during the Soviet Union because of his religious activism.

Mikhail Sado’s origin goes back to Hakkari, a village of Levon north of Tiari. His father was Challo and his mother Mariam. His wife Zina was born in Moscow. She was one year old when her family was forced to leave the USSR for Iran under Stalin’s order. She was raised in Iran and returned to the Soviet Union in 1962.

The Sados have two sons; his youngest son Rabban Estepanos, is the presiding priest of the oldest Russian Orthodox Church in St. Petersburg, Cathedral of The Holy Trinity of St. Alexander Nevsky Monastery built in 1703–1714. During Soviet rule, the government buried many communists in the gardens of this monastery to desecrate the Christian faith. This church is the seat of the metropolitan of St. Petersburg.

Rabban Estepanos speaks Assyrian fluently. He assisted his father in publishing a book in Russian on the life and accomplishments of the prominent Assyrians in the Soviet Union. Mikhail Sado’s older son (a transportation business owner) funded this publication.

Sixty Assyrians in Leningrad were killed under Joseph Stalin's order. A memorial monument in their remembrance was erected in St. Petersburg on August 27, 2000. More than 1,000 Assyrians in the entire Soviet Union were killed under Stalin’s order.

See also
 Assyrians in Russia
 Assyrian Neo-Aramaic

References

External links
 Pictures of Sado and his Assyrian Collections, pp. 9–12

Russian people of Assyrian descent
Linguists from Russia
1934 births
2010 deaths
Burials at Nikolskoe Cemetery